The following is a comparison of CPU microarchitectures.

See also 
 Processor design
 Comparison of instruction set architectures

Notes

References

Computer architecture
Computing comparisons